Gnomini is a tribe of longhorn beetles of the subfamily Lamiinae. It was described by Thomson in 1864.

Taxonomy
 Gnoma Fabricius, 1801
 Imantocera Thomson, 1857
 Psectrocera Pascoe, 1862
 Trichognoma Breuning, 1956

References

Lamiinae